"There's No Home for You Here" is a song by American alternative rock band the White Stripes, featured on their fourth studio album, Elephant (2003). It was released as the fourth single from the album on March 15, 2004, in the United Kingdom. The B-side of the 7-inch vinyl record is a medley of "I Fought Piranhas" and "Let's Build a Home" – from The White Stripes (1999) and De Stijl (2000), respectively – recorded at Electric Lady Studios on November 16, 2003. The single failed to chart.  Of the track, Jack said, "Our idea was to see how far we could go with an eight track recorder, and I think how far we went is too far."

Track listing

Personnel
The White Stripes
 Jack White – vocals, guitar, piano, production, mixing
 Meg White – drums, choirs

Additional personnel
 Liam Watson – engineering, mixing
 Noel Summerville – mastering

References

2003 songs
2004 singles
Songs written by Jack White
XL Recordings singles
The White Stripes songs